Self-experimentation refers to the special case of single-subject research in which the experimenter conducts the experiment on themselves. 

Usually this means that a single person is the designer, operator, subject, analyst, and user or reporter of the experiment.

Also referred to as Personal science or N-of-1 research, self-experimentation is an example of citizen science, since it can also be led by patients or people interested in their own health and well-being, as both research subjects and self-experimenters.

Current pioners and practitioners of self-experimentation include the late Seth Roberts, Tim Ferriss, and a sprawling community of Quantified Self.

Biology and medicine

Human scientific self-experimentation principally (though not necessarily) falls into the fields of medicine and psychology. Self-experimentation has a long and well-documented history in medicine which continues to the present day.

For example, after failed attempts to infect piglets in 1984, Barry Marshall drank a petri dish of the Helicobacter pylori from a patient, and soon developed gastritis, achlorhydria, stomach discomfort, nausea, vomiting, and halitosis.  The results were published in 1985 in the Medical Journal of Australia, and is among the most cited articles from the journal.  He was awarded the Nobel Prize in Physiology or Medicine in 2005.

Evaluations have been presented in the context of clinical trials and program evaluations.

Psychology

The self-experimental approach has long and often been applied to practical psychological problems. Benjamin Franklin recorded his self-experiment of successively devoting his attention for a week to one of thirteen "Virtues", "leaving the other Virtues to their ordinary Chance, only marking every Evening the Faults of the Day."

In psychology, the best-known self-experiments are the memory studies of Hermann Ebbinghaus, which established many basic characteristics of human memory through tedious experiments involving nonsense syllables.

In Self-change: Strategies for solving personal problems, M. J. Mahoney suggested that self-experimentation be used as a method of psychological treatment, and recommended that clients be taught basic scientific methods, in order that the client become a "personal scientist."

Chemistry

Several popular and well-known sweeteners were discovered by deliberate or sometimes accidental tasting of reaction products. Sucralose was discovered by a scientist, Constantin Fahlberg, mishearing the instruction to "test" the compounds as to "taste" the compounds. Fahlberg noticed a sweet taste on his fingers and associated the taste with his work in the chemistry labs at Johns Hopkins; out of that taste test came Saccharin. Cyclamate was discovered when a chemist noticed a sweet taste on his cigarette that he had set down on his bench. Aspartame was also discovered accidentally when chemist Schlatter tasted a sweet substance that had stuck to his hand.  Acesulfame potassium is another sweetener discovered when a chemist tasted what he had made.

Leo Sternbach, the inventor of Librium and Valium, tested chemicals that he made on himself, saying in an interview, "I tried everything. Many drugs. Once, in the sixties, I was sent home for two days. It was an extremely potent drug, not a Benzedrine. I slept for a long time. My wife was very worried."

Swiss chemist Albert Hofmann first discovered the psychedelic properties of LSD five years after its creation, when he accidentally absorbed a small amount of the drug through his fingertips. Days later, he intentionally self-experimented with it.

Physics
Charles Dalziel studied the effects of electricity on animals and humans, and wrote The Effects of Electric Shock on Man, a book in which he explains the effects of different amounts of electricity on human subjects. He carried out experiments on human subjects, including himself. He also invented the ground-fault circuit interrupter or GFCI, based on his understanding of electric shock in humans.

In 1998 a British scientist, Kevin Warwick, became the first human being to test an RFID as an implant to control surrounding technology. In 2002 he went on to have an array of 100 electrodes fired into the median nerve of his left arm during a two-hour neurosurgical operation. With this implant in place, over a three-month period, he conducted a number of experiments, including the first direct electronic communication between the nervous systems of two humans.

Current practitioners of self experimentation

The 21st century has seen a revival of self-experimentation. With the late Seth Roberts having a popular blog with many interesting findings of himself and others. Bestselling author Tim Ferriss claims to be a self-experimenter to the extreme. The Quantified Self community has many members that do many kinds of experiments and meet-ups to report about them, along with yearly conferences discussing findings, methods and other aspects.
Alexander Shulgin devoted his entire career to self experimentation, publishing his results in the widely acclaimed books PiHKAL and TiHKAL. Dr. Zee, a self-proclaimed Neo-Shulginist, is also known for a career of self experimentation. More generally, those who explore psychedelics are often termed psychonauts.

In fiction

Examples in classic fiction include the tales of The Invisible Man and Dr. Jekyll and Mr. Hyde. In each case the scientist's unorthodox theories lead to permanent change and ultimately to self-destruction.

Self-experimentation is a common trait amongst mad scientists and evil geniuses in more contemporary fiction and is part of the creation story of many comic book supervillains, and some superheroes. For example, the Spider-Man villain The Lizard lost his arm in a war (other versions vary), and experimented with reptilian DNA to try to grow it back; however, the therapy caused him to mutate into a half-human-half-reptile creature. The Fantastic Four were created when the Four were testing Reed Richards's new prototype rocket and were exposed to cosmic rays, giving them super powers. Other cases include the Man-Bat, the Ultra-Humanite, the Green Goblin, and the animated Justice League version of Cheetah.

The deepest example for self-experimentation was shown in Ang Lee's Hulk (2003), where David Banner experimented on himself to improve on his own limits, which is also why his son had many different abilities.

See also
 Participant observation
 Psychonautics
 Personal science 
 Quantified self
 Seth Roberts

References

- Hanley et al 2019, "Review of Scientific Self-Experimentation: Ethics History, Regulation, Scenarios, and Views Among Ethics Committees and Prominent Scientists"

Scientific method

Self